Daniel Lewis (born April 3, 1976) is a Canadian former volleyball player, a member of Canada men's national volleyball team, bronze medallist at the 2011 NORCECA Championship, bronze medallist at the 2015 Pan American Games, as well as a double Polish Champion, four-time Slovenian Champion.

Career
Lewis played at the University of Manitoba for the Bisons for five seasons from 1995 to 2001. In the 1995-96 season, he was named the CIAU men's volleyball Rookie of the Year and won the 1996 CIAU championship while being named the Championship MVP. He finished his university career much like how he started it, by winning the CIAU national championship as a member of the Bisons in 2001.

Lewis played beach volleyball at the 1999 Pan American Games, finishing in seventh place alongside Brian Gatzke.

In season 2013/2014, Lewis played for ZAKSA Kędzierzyn-Koźle. ZAKSA, including Lewis, achieved silver medal of Polish Cup. In January 2015 went to French club Rennes Volley 35.

He ended up his sporting career in April 2017.

Sporting achievements

University
 1996  CIAU Men's Volleyball Championship, with Manitoba Bisons
 2001  CIAU Men's Volleyball Championship, with Manitoba Bisons

Clubs

CEV Champions League
  2007/2008 – with Skra Bełchatów

National championships
 2006/2007  Polish Cup, with Skra Bełchatów
 2006/2007  Polish Championship, with Skra Bełchatów
 2007/2008  Polish Championship, with Skra Bełchatów
 2009/2010  Slovenian Championship, with ACH Volley
 2009/2010  Slovenian Cup, with ACH Volley
 2009/2010  Slovenian Championship, with ACH Volley
 2010/2011  Slovenian Cup, with ACH Volley
 2010/2011  Slovenian Championship, with ACH Volley
 2011/2012  Slovenian Cup, with ACH Volley
 2011/2012  Slovenian Championship, with ACH Volley
 2012/2013  Slovenian Cup, with ACH Volley
 2012/2013  Slovenian Championship, with ACH Volley
 2013/2014  Polish Cup, with ZAKSA Kędzierzyn-Koźle

National team

NORCECA Championship
  2001 Bridgetown

Individually
 1996 CIAU Men's Volleyball Championship MVP 
 1995-96 CIAU Men's Volleyball Rookie of the Year 
 2010 CEV Champions League – Best Receiver
2015 Men's NORCECA Volleyball Champions Cup MVP

References

External links
 PlusLiga player profile
 
 

1976 births
Living people
Sportspeople from Oakville, Ontario
Canadian men's beach volleyball players
Canadian men's volleyball players
Canadian expatriate sportspeople in Poland
Volleyball players at the 2007 Pan American Games
Expatriate volleyball players in Poland
Skra Bełchatów players
ZAKSA Kędzierzyn-Koźle players
BBTS Bielsko-Biała players
Volleyball players at the 2015 Pan American Games
Pan American Games bronze medalists for Canada
Beach volleyball players at the 1999 Pan American Games
Pan American Games medalists in volleyball
Manitoba Bisons volleyball players
Medalists at the 2015 Pan American Games